Rosh HaNikra is a kibbutz in northern Israel. Located on the Mediterranean coast near the Rosh HaNikra grottoes and the border with Lebanon, it falls under the jurisdiction of Mateh Asher Regional Council.

History
The kibbutz was established on 6 January 1949 by a gar'in of demobilised Palmach soldiers who moved there from Kibbutz Hanita, along with Zionist youth movement members and young Holocaust survivors.

Economy
The kibbutz grows bananas and avocados, and raises turkeys. In 1974, kibbutz members founded a biotechnology company called Rahan Meristem, which included the first commercial tissue culture laboratory in the country. Rahan developed new procedures for large scale, in-vitro, clonal propagation of over 200 plant genera including ornamental, industrial, fruit, and vegetable crops. In the mid-1980s, in-vitro propagated banana plants became the leading product. Rahan is now a center of research and consultation for the banana industry throughout the world. A formal R&D department was established in 1991 to provide technical support. Areas of expertise include molecular and classical genetics, plant cell and tissue culture, plant biochemistry and physiology, bacteriology and industrial biotechnology. Methods have also been developed for the control of contaminating microbes, early detection and elimination of somaclonal variation, reduction of labor and fixed costs in production, etc.

In the early 21st century, the kibbutz was privatized.

Notable people

 Sacha Baron Cohen, English actor, comedian, screenwriter, and producer
 Nufar Edelman (born 1982), Olympic sailor
 Eitan Friedlander (born 1958), Olympic sailor
 Dekel Keinan, Israeli footballer

See also
Agricultural research in Israel
Rosh Hanikra Islands

References

External links
Kibbutz website
Rosh HaNikra Jewish Agency

Kibbutzim
Kibbutz Movement
Privatized kibbutzim
Populated places established in 1949
Populated places in Northern District (Israel)
1949 establishments in Israel